Java is a high-level, class-based, object-oriented programming language that is designed to have as few implementation dependencies as possible. It is a general-purpose programming language intended to let programmers write once, run anywhere (WORA), meaning that compiled Java code can run on all platforms that support Java without the need to recompile. Java applications are typically compiled to bytecode that can run on any Java virtual machine (JVM) regardless of the underlying computer architecture. The syntax of Java is similar to C and C++, but has fewer low-level facilities than either of them. The Java runtime provides dynamic capabilities (such as reflection and runtime code modification) that are typically not available in traditional compiled languages. , Java was one of the most popular programming languages in use according to GitHub, particularly for client–server web applications, with a reported 9 million developers.

Java was originally developed by James Gosling at Sun Microsystems. It was released in May 1995 as a core component of Sun Microsystems' Java platform. The original and reference implementation Java compilers, virtual machines, and class libraries were originally released by Sun under proprietary licenses. As of May 2007, in compliance with the specifications of the Java Community Process, Sun had relicensed most of its Java technologies under the GPL-2.0-only license. Oracle offers its own HotSpot Java Virtual Machine, however the official reference implementation is the OpenJDK JVM which is free open-source software and used by most developers and is the default JVM for almost all Linux distributions. 

, Java 19 is the latest version, while Java 17, 11 and 8 are the current long-term support (LTS) versions.

History

James Gosling, Mike Sheridan, and Patrick Naughton initiated the Java language project in June 1991. Java was originally designed for interactive television, but it was too advanced for the digital cable television industry at the time. The language was initially called Oak after an oak tree that stood outside Gosling's office. Later the project went by the name Green and was finally renamed Java, from Java coffee, a type of coffee from Indonesia. Gosling designed Java with a C/C++-style syntax that system and application programmers would find familiar.

Sun Microsystems released the first public implementation as Java 1.0 in 1996. It promised write once, run anywhere (WORA) functionality, providing no-cost run-times on popular platforms. Fairly secure and featuring configurable security, it allowed network- and file-access restrictions. Major web browsers soon incorporated the ability to run Java applets within web pages, and Java quickly became popular. The Java 1.0 compiler was re-written in Java by Arthur van Hoff to comply strictly with the Java 1.0 language specification. With the advent of Java 2 (released initially as J2SE 1.2 in December 1998 1999), new versions had multiple configurations built for different types of platforms. J2EE included technologies and APIs for enterprise applications typically run in server environments, while J2ME featured APIs optimized for mobile applications. The desktop version was renamed J2SE. In 2006, for marketing purposes, Sun renamed new J2 versions as Java EE, Java ME, and Java SE, respectively.

In 1997, Sun Microsystems approached the ISO/IEC JTC 1 standards body and later the Ecma International to formalize Java, but it soon withdrew from the process. Java remains a de facto standard, controlled through the Java Community Process. At one time, Sun made most of its Java implementations available without charge, despite their proprietary software status. Sun generated revenue from Java through the selling of licenses for specialized products such as the Java Enterprise System.

On November 13, 2006, Sun released much of its Java virtual machine (JVM) as free and open-source software (FOSS), under the terms of the GPL-2.0-only license. On May 8, 2007, Sun finished the process, making all of its JVM's core code available under free software/open-source distribution terms, aside from a small portion of code to which Sun did not hold the copyright.

Sun's vice-president Rich Green said that Sun's ideal role with regard to Java was as an evangelist. Following Oracle Corporation's acquisition of Sun Microsystems in 2009–10, Oracle has described itself as the steward of Java technology with a relentless commitment to fostering a community of participation and transparency. This did not prevent Oracle from filing a lawsuit against Google shortly after that for using Java inside the Android SDK (see the Android section).

On April 2, 2010, James Gosling resigned from Oracle.

In January 2016, Oracle announced that Java run-time environments based on JDK 9 will discontinue the browser plugin.

Java software runs on everything from laptops to data centers, game consoles to scientific supercomputers.

Oracle (and others) highly recommend uninstalling outdated and unsupported versions of Java, due to unresolved security issues in older versions.

Principles
There were five primary goals in the creation of the Java language:

 It must be simple, object-oriented, and familiar.
 It must be robust and secure.
 It must be architecture-neutral and portable.
 It must execute with high performance.
 It must be interpreted, threaded, and dynamic.

Versions

, Java 8, 11 and 17 are supported as Long-Term Support (LTS) versions.

Oracle released the last zero-cost public update for the legacy version Java 8 LTS in January 2019 for commercial use, although it will otherwise still support Java 8 with public updates for personal use indefinitely. Other vendors have begun to offer zero-cost builds of OpenJDK 18 and 8, 11 and 17 that are still receiving security and other upgrades.

Major release versions of Java, along with their release dates:

Editions

Sun has defined and supports four editions of Java targeting different application environments and segmented many of its APIs so that they belong to one of the platforms. The platforms are:

 Java Card for smart-cards.
 Java Platform, Micro Edition (Java ME) – targeting environments with limited resources.
 Java Platform, Standard Edition (Java SE) – targeting workstation environments.
 Java Platform, Enterprise Edition (Java EE) – targeting large distributed enterprise or Internet environments.

The classes in the Java APIs are organized into separate groups called packages. Each package contains a set of related interfaces, classes, subpackages and exceptions.

Sun also provided an edition called Personal Java that has been superseded by later, standards-based Java ME configuration-profile pairings.

Execution system

Java JVM and bytecode

One design goal of Java is portability, which means that programs written for the Java platform must run similarly on any combination of hardware and operating system with adequate run time support. This is achieved by compiling the Java language code to an intermediate representation called Java bytecode, instead of directly to architecture-specific machine code. Java bytecode instructions are analogous to machine code, but they are intended to be executed by a virtual machine (VM) written specifically for the host hardware. End-users commonly use a Java Runtime Environment (JRE) installed on their device for standalone Java applications or a web browser for Java applets.

Standard libraries provide a generic way to access host-specific features such as graphics, threading, and networking.

The use of universal bytecode makes porting simple. However, the overhead of interpreting bytecode into machine instructions made interpreted programs almost always run more slowly than native executables. Just-in-time (JIT) compilers that compile byte-codes to machine code during runtime were introduced from an early stage. Java's Hotspot compiler is actually two compilers in one; and with GraalVM (included in e.g. Java 11, but removed as of Java 16) allowing tiered compilation. Java itself is platform-independent and is adapted to the particular platform it is to run on by a Java virtual machine (JVM) for it, which translates the Java bytecode into the platform's machine language.

Performance

Programs written in Java have a reputation for being slower and requiring more memory than those written in C++. However, Java programs' execution speed improved significantly with the introduction of just-in-time compilation in 1997/1998 for Java 1.1, the addition of language features supporting better code analysis (such as inner classes, the StringBuilder class, optional assertions, etc.), and optimizations in the Java virtual machine, such as HotSpot becoming Sun's default JVM in 2000. With Java 1.5, the performance was improved with the addition of the java.util.concurrent package, including lock-free implementations of the ConcurrentMaps and other multi-core collections, and it was improved further with Java 1.6.

Non-JVM
Some platforms offer direct hardware support for Java; there are micro controllers that can run Java bytecode in hardware instead of a software Java virtual machine, and some ARM-based processors could have hardware support for executing Java bytecode through their Jazelle option, though support has mostly been dropped in current implementations of ARM.

Automatic memory management
Java uses an automatic garbage collector to manage memory in the object lifecycle. The programmer determines when objects are created, and the Java runtime is responsible for recovering the memory once objects are no longer in use. Once no references to an object remain, the unreachable memory becomes eligible to be freed automatically by the garbage collector. Something similar to a memory leak may still occur if a programmer's code holds a reference to an object that is no longer needed, typically when objects that are no longer needed are stored in containers that are still in use. If methods for a non-existent object are called, a null pointer exception is thrown.

One of the ideas behind Java's automatic memory management model is that programmers can be spared the burden of having to perform manual memory management. In some languages, memory for the creation of objects is implicitly allocated on the stack or explicitly allocated and deallocated from the heap. In the latter case, the responsibility of managing memory resides with the programmer. If the program does not deallocate an object, a memory leak occurs. If the program attempts to access or deallocate memory that has already been deallocated, the result is undefined and difficult to predict, and the program is likely to become unstable or crash. This can be partially remedied by the use of smart pointers, but these add overhead and complexity. Note that garbage collection does not prevent logical memory leaks, i.e. those where the memory is still referenced but never used.

Garbage collection may happen at any time. Ideally, it will occur when a program is idle. It is guaranteed to be triggered if there is insufficient free memory on the heap to allocate a new object; this can cause a program to stall momentarily. Explicit memory management is not possible in Java.

Java does not support C/C++ style pointer arithmetic, where object addresses can be arithmetically manipulated (e.g. by adding or subtracting an offset). This allows the garbage collector to relocate referenced objects and ensures type safety and security.

As in C++ and some other object-oriented languages, variables of Java's primitive data types are either stored directly in fields (for objects) or on the stack (for methods) rather than on the heap, as is commonly true for non-primitive data types (but see escape analysis). This was a conscious decision by Java's designers for performance reasons.

Java contains multiple types of garbage collectors. Since Java 9, HotSpot uses the Garbage First Garbage Collector (G1GC) as the default. However, there are also several other garbage collectors that can be used to manage the heap. For most applications in Java, G1GC is sufficient. Previously, the Parallel Garbage Collector was used in Java 8.

Having solved the memory management problem does not relieve the programmer of the burden of handling properly other kinds of resources, like network or database connections, file handles, etc., especially in the presence of exceptions.

Syntax

The syntax of Java is largely influenced by C++ and C. Unlike C++, which combines the syntax for structured, generic, and object-oriented programming, Java was built almost exclusively as an object-oriented language. All code is written inside classes, and every data item is an object, with the exception of the primitive data types, (i.e. integers, floating-point numbers, boolean values, and characters), which are not objects for performance reasons. Java reuses some popular aspects of C++ (such as the  method).

Unlike C++, Java does not support operator overloading or multiple inheritance for classes, though multiple inheritance is supported for interfaces.

Java uses comments similar to those of C++. There are three different styles of comments: a single line style marked with two slashes (//), a multiple line style opened with /* and closed with */, and the Javadoc commenting style opened with /** and closed with */. The Javadoc style of commenting allows the user to run the Javadoc executable to create documentation for the program and can be read by some integrated development environments (IDEs) such as Eclipse to allow developers to access documentation within the IDE.

Hello world example
The traditional Hello world program can be written in Java as:
public class HelloWorldApp {
    public static void main(String[] args) {
        System.out.println("Hello World!"); // Prints the string to the console.
    }
}

All source files must be named after the public class they contain, appending the suffix .java, for example, HelloWorldApp.java. It must first be compiled into bytecode, using a Java compiler, producing a file with the .class suffix (HelloWorldApp.class, in this case). Only then can it be executed or launched. The Java source file may only contain one public class, but it can contain multiple classes with a non-public access modifier and any number of public inner classes. When the source file contains multiple classes, it is necessary to make one class (introduced by the class keyword) public (preceded by the public keyword) and name the source file with that public class name.

A class that is not declared public may be stored in any .java file. The compiler will generate a class file for each class defined in the source file. The name of the class file is the name of the class, with .class appended. For class file generation, anonymous classes are treated as if their name were the concatenation of the name of their enclosing class, a $, and an integer.

The keyword public denotes that a method can be called from code in other classes, or that a class may be used by classes outside the class hierarchy. The class hierarchy is related to the name of the directory in which the .java file is located. This is called an access level modifier. Other access level modifiers include the keywords private (a method that can only be accessed in the same class) and protected (which allows code from the same package to access). If a piece of code attempts to access private methods or protected methods, the JVM will throw a SecurityException

The keyword static in front of a method indicates a static method, which is associated only with the class and not with any specific instance of that class. Only static methods can be invoked without a reference to an object. Static methods cannot access any class members that are not also static. Methods that are not designated static are instance methods and require a specific instance of a class to operate.

The keyword void indicates that the main method does not return any value to the caller. If a Java program is to exit with an error code, it must call System.exit() explicitly.

The method name main is not a keyword in the Java language. It is simply the name of the method the Java launcher calls to pass control to the program. Java classes that run in managed environments such as applets and Enterprise JavaBeans do not use or need a main() method. A Java program may contain multiple classes that have main methods, which means that the VM needs to be explicitly told which class to launch from.

The main method must accept an array of  objects. By convention, it is referenced as args although any other legal identifier name can be used. Since Java 5, the main method can also use variable arguments, in the form of public static void main(String... args), allowing the main method to be invoked with an arbitrary number of String arguments. The effect of this alternate declaration is semantically identical (to the args parameter which is still an array of String objects), but it allows an alternative syntax for creating and passing the array.

The Java launcher launches Java by loading a given class (specified on the command line or as an attribute in a JAR) and starting its public static void main(String[]) method. Stand-alone programs must declare this method explicitly. The String[] args parameter is an array of String objects containing any arguments passed to the class. The parameters to main are often passed by means of a command line.

Printing is part of a Java standard library: The  class defines a public static field called . The out object is an instance of the  class and provides many methods for printing data to standard out, including  which also appends a new line to the passed string.

The string "Hello World!" is automatically converted to a String object by the compiler.

Example with methods
// This is an example of a single line comment using two slashes

/*
 * This is an example of a multiple line comment using the slash and asterisk.
 * This type of comment can be used to hold a lot of information or deactivate
 * code, but it is very important to remember to close the comment.
 */

package fibsandlies;

import java.util.Map;
import java.util.HashMap;

/**
 * This is an example of a Javadoc comment; Javadoc can compile documentation
 * from this text. Javadoc comments must immediately precede the class, method,
 * or field being documented.
 * @author Wikipedia Volunteers
 */
public class FibCalculator extends Fibonacci implements Calculator {
    private static Map<Integer, Integer> memoized = new HashMap<>();

    /*
     * The main method written as follows is used by the JVM as a starting point
     * for the program.
     */
    public static void main(String[] args) {
        memoized.put(1, 1);
        memoized.put(2, 1);
        System.out.println(fibonacci(12)); // Get the 12th Fibonacci number and print to console
    }

    /**
     * An example of a method written in Java, wrapped in a class.
     * Given a non-negative number FIBINDEX, returns
     * the Nth Fibonacci number, where N equals FIBINDEX.
     * 
     * @param fibIndex The index of the Fibonacci number
     * @return the Fibonacci number
     */
    public static int fibonacci(int fibIndex) {
        if (memoized.containsKey(fibIndex)) {
            return memoized.get(fibIndex);
        }

        int answer = fibonacci(fibIndex - 1) + fibonacci(fibIndex - 2);
        memoized.put(fibIndex, answer);
        return answer;
    }
}

Special classes

Applet

Java applets were programs that were embedded in other applications, typically in a Web page displayed in a web browser. The Java applet API is now deprecated since Java 9 in 2017.

Servlet

Java servlet technology provides Web developers with a simple, consistent mechanism for extending the functionality of a Web server and for accessing existing business systems. Servlets are server-side Java EE components that generate responses to requests from clients. Most of the time, this means generating HTML pages in response to HTTP requests, although there are a number of other standard servlet classes available, for example for WebSocket communication.

The Java servlet API has to some extent been superseded (but still used under the hood) by two standard Java technologies for web services:
 the Java API for RESTful Web Services (JAX-RS 2.0) useful for AJAX, JSON and REST services, and
 the Java API for XML Web Services (JAX-WS) useful for SOAP Web Services.

Typical implementations of these APIs on Application Servers or Servlet Containers use a standard servlet for handling all interactions with the HTTP requests and responses that delegate to the web service methods for the actual business logic.

JavaServer Pages

JavaServer Pages (JSP) are server-side Java EE components that generate responses, typically HTML pages, to HTTP requests from clients. JSPs embed Java code in an HTML page by using the special delimiters <% and %>. A JSP is compiled to a Java servlet, a Java application in its own right, the first time it is accessed. After that, the generated servlet creates the response.

Swing application

Swing is a graphical user interface library for the Java SE platform. It is possible to specify a different look and feel through the pluggable look and feel system of Swing. Clones of Windows, GTK+, and Motif are supplied by Sun. Apple also provides an Aqua look and feel for macOS. Where prior implementations of these looks and feels may have been considered lacking, Swing in Java SE 6 addresses this problem by using more native GUI widget drawing routines of the underlying platforms.

JavaFX application

JavaFX is a software platform for creating and delivering desktop applications, as well as rich web applications that can run across a wide variety of devices. JavaFX is intended to replace Swing as the standard GUI library for Java SE, but since JDK 11 JavaFX has not been in the core JDK and instead in a separate module. JavaFX has support for desktop computers and web browsers on Microsoft Windows, Linux, and macOS. JavaFX does not have support for native OS look and feels.

Generics

In 2004, generics were added to the Java language, as part of J2SE 5.0. Prior to the introduction of generics, each variable declaration had to be of a specific type. For container classes, for example, this is a problem because there is no easy way to create a container that accepts only specific types of objects. Either the container operates on all subtypes of a class or interface, usually Object, or a different container class has to be created for each contained class. Generics allow compile-time type checking without having to create many container classes, each containing almost identical code. In addition to enabling more efficient code, certain runtime exceptions are prevented from occurring, by issuing compile-time errors. If Java prevented all runtime type errors (ClassCastExceptions) from occurring, it would be type safe.

In 2016, the type system of Java was proven unsound in that it is possible to use generics to construct classes and methods that allow assignment of an instance one class to a variable of another unrelated class. Such code is accepted by the compiler, but fails at run time with a class cast exception.

Criticism

Criticisms directed at Java include the implementation of generics, speed, the handling of unsigned numbers, the implementation of floating-point arithmetic, and a history of security vulnerabilities in the primary Java VM implementation HotSpot.

Class libraries

The Java Class Library is the standard library, developed to support application development in Java. It is controlled by Oracle in cooperation with others through the Java Community Process program. Companies or individuals participating in this process can influence the design and development of the APIs. This process has been a subject of controversy during the 2010s. The class library contains features such as:

 The core libraries, which include:
 IO/NIO
 Networking (NOTE: new HTTP Client since Java 11)
 Reflection
 Concurrency
 Generics
 Scripting/Compiler
 Functional programming (Lambda, Streaming)
 Collection libraries that implement data structures such as lists, dictionaries, trees, sets, queues and double-ended queue, or stacks
 XML Processing (Parsing, Transforming, Validating) libraries
 Security
 Internationalization and localization libraries
 The integration libraries, which allow the application writer to communicate with external systems. These libraries include:
 The Java Database Connectivity (JDBC) API for database access
 Java Naming and Directory Interface (JNDI) for lookup and discovery
 RMI and CORBA for distributed application development
 JMX for managing and monitoring applications
 User interface libraries, which include:
 The (heavyweight, or native) Abstract Window Toolkit (AWT), which provides GUI components, the means for laying out those components and the means for handling events from those components
 The (lightweight) Swing libraries, which are built on AWT but provide (non-native) implementations of the AWT widgetry
 APIs for audio capture, processing, and playback
 JavaFX
 A platform dependent implementation of the Java virtual machine that is the means by which the bytecodes of the Java libraries and third party applications are executed
 Plugins, which enable applets to be run in web browsers
 Java Web Start, which allows Java applications to be efficiently distributed to end users across the Internet
 Licensing and documentation

Documentation

Javadoc is a comprehensive documentation system, created by Sun Microsystems. It provides developers with an organized system for documenting their code. Javadoc comments have an extra asterisk at the beginning, i.e. the delimiters are /** and */, whereas the normal multi-line comments in Java are delimited by /* and */, and single-line comments start with //.

Implementations

Oracle Corporation is the current owner of the official implementation of the Java SE platform, following their acquisition of Sun Microsystems on January 27, 2010. This implementation is based on the original implementation of Java by Sun. The Oracle implementation is available for Microsoft Windows (still works for XP, while only later versions are currently officially supported), macOS, Linux, and Solaris. Because Java lacks any formal standardization recognized by Ecma International, ISO/IEC, ANSI, or other third-party standards organizations, the Oracle implementation is the de facto standard.

The Oracle implementation is packaged into two different distributions: The Java Runtime Environment (JRE) which contains the parts of the Java SE platform required to run Java programs and is intended for end users, and the Java Development Kit (JDK), which is intended for software developers and includes development tools such as the Java compiler, Javadoc, Jar, and a debugger. Oracle has also released GraalVM, a high performance Java dynamic compiler and interpreter.

OpenJDK is another notable Java SE implementation that is licensed under the GNU GPL. The implementation started when Sun began releasing the Java source code under the GPL. As of Java SE 7, OpenJDK is the official Java reference implementation.

The goal of Java is to make all implementations of Java compatible. Historically, Sun's trademark license for usage of the Java brand insists that all implementations be compatible. This resulted in a legal dispute with Microsoft after Sun claimed that the Microsoft implementation did not support RMI or JNI and had added platform-specific features of their own. Sun sued in 1997, and, in 2001, won a settlement of US$20 million, as well as a court order enforcing the terms of the license from Sun. As a result, Microsoft no longer ships Java with Windows.

Platform-independent Java is essential to Java EE, and an even more rigorous validation is required to certify an implementation. This environment enables portable server-side applications.

Use outside the Java platform
The Java programming language requires the presence of a software platform in order for compiled programs to be executed.

Oracle supplies the Java platform for use with Java. The Android SDK is an alternative software platform, used primarily for developing Android applications with its own GUI system.

Android
The Java language is a key pillar in Android, an open source mobile operating system. Although Android, built on the Linux kernel, is written largely in C, the Android SDK uses the Java language as the basis for Android applications but does not use any of its standard GUI, SE, ME or other established Java standards. The bytecode language supported by the Android SDK is incompatible with Java bytecode and runs on its own virtual machine, optimized for low-memory devices such as smartphones and tablet computers. Depending on the Android version, the bytecode is either interpreted by the Dalvik virtual machine or compiled into native code by the Android Runtime.

Android does not provide the full Java SE standard library, although the Android SDK does include an independent implementation of a large subset of it. It supports Java 6 and some Java 7 features, offering an implementation compatible with the standard library (Apache Harmony).

Controversy

The use of Java-related technology in Android led to a legal dispute between Oracle and Google. On May 7, 2012, a San Francisco jury found that if APIs could be copyrighted, then Google had infringed Oracle's copyrights by the use of Java in Android devices. District Judge William Alsup ruled on May 31, 2012, that APIs cannot be copyrighted, but this was reversed by the United States Court of Appeals for the Federal Circuit in May 2014. On May 26, 2016, the district court decided in favor of Google, ruling the copyright infringement of the Java API in Android constitutes fair use. In March 2018, this ruling was overturned by the Appeals Court, which sent down the case of determining the damages to federal court in San Francisco.
Google filed a petition for writ of certiorari with the Supreme Court of the United States in January 2019 to challenge the two rulings that were made by the Appeals Court in Oracle's favor. On April 5, 2021, the Court ruled 6-2 in Google's favor, that its use of Java APIs should be considered fair use. However, the court refused to rule on the copyrightability of APIs, choosing instead to determine their ruling by considering Java's API copyrightable "purely for argument’s sake."

See also

 C#
 C++
 Dalvik, used in old Android versions, replaced by non-JIT Android Runtime
 Java Heterogeneous Distributed Computing
 List of Java virtual machines
 List of Java APIs
 List of JVM languages

Comparison of Java with other languages
 Comparison of C# and Java
 Comparison of Java and C++
 Comparison of programming languages

References

Works cited

External links

Official Website

Java Weekly

 
Articles with example Java code
C programming language family
Class-based programming languages
Computer-related introductions in 1995
Concurrent programming languages
Programming language
Programming language
JVM programming languages
Multi-paradigm programming languages
Object-oriented programming languages
Programming languages created in 1995
Programming languages
Statically typed programming languages
Sun Microsystems
Compiled programming languages